Ray L. Olsen (September 4, 1904 – February 14, 1992) was an American politician in the state of Washington. He served in the Washington House of Representatives from 1951 to 1967 for district 35.

References

1983 deaths
1904 births
Democratic Party members of the Washington House of Representatives
20th-century American politicians